Lady Peggy's Escape is a 1913 American silent film produced by Kalem Company and distributed by General Films Company. It was directed by Sidney Olcott with himself, Gene Gauntier, Helen Lindroth and Jack J. Clark in the leading roles.

Cast

Production notes
 The film was shot in Beaufort, County Kerry, Ireland, during the summer of 1912.

References
 Michel Derrien, Aux origines du cinéma irlandais: Sidney Olcott, le premier oeil, TIR 2013.

External links

 Lady Peggy's Escape website dedicated to Sidney Olcott

1913 films
American silent short films
Films set in Ireland
Films shot in Ireland
Films directed by Sidney Olcott
1913 adventure films
American black-and-white films
American adventure films
1910s American films
Silent adventure films
1910s English-language films